{{DISPLAYTITLE:Vitamin B12-transporting ATPase}}

In enzymology, a vitamin B12-transporting ATPase is an enzyme that catalyzes the chemical reaction

ATP + H2O + vitamin B12out  ADP + phosphate + vitamin B12in

The 3 substrates of this enzyme are ATP, H2O, and vitamin B12, whereas its 3 products are ADP, phosphate, and vitamin B12.

This enzyme belongs to the family of hydrolases, specifically those acting on acid anhydrides to catalyse transmembrane movement of substances. The systematic name of this enzyme class is ATP phosphohydrolase (vitamin B12-importing). This enzyme participates in abc transporters - general.

Structural studies

References

 
 
 

EC 3.6.3
Enzymes of known structure